Saf-t-Bra was a hard plastic brassiere introduced during World War II, to prevent injuries to the breasts of women war workers. It was produced by Wilson Goggles.

References

External links 
 Safety Garb for Women Workers, ca. 1943

Brassieres
United States home front during World War II